"Stormur" (Icelandic for "Storm") is a song written and recorded by Icelandic post-rock band Sigur Rós for their seventh studio album Kveikur. It appears as the fifth track on the album. The song was released on September 9, 2013 to UK mainstream radio as a promotional single from Kveikur.

Usage in media
"Stormur" has so far been used once in commercial media. The song was used in a commercial for the 2013 iTunes Festival, a month-long music festival which took place at The Roundhouse in London from September 2 to October 1, 2013. Sigur Rós themselves performed at the festival on September 3, 2013 as the second headline act of the festival, with the performance being streamed live worldwide, and available to replay for free on the iTunes Store.

Music video
An interactive music video for "Stormur" was debuted by the band on August 5, 2013. The interactive video invited fans of the band on online photo-sharing, video-sharing and social networking service Instagram to submit videos, made through Instagram, to be featured in an interactive "ever-evolving" and "always altering" fan-made music video for "Stormur".  Fans can create and upload any video, and add the hashtag "#stormur" to enter the cycle of constantly updated loops for the video to play. As of current, the project is still in operation, and the video itself has not yet closed production.

The video itself featured numerous Instagram videos from various users that are randomly generated into the video, with two clips being shown each time. With the clips being randomly generated, there is no singular music video for "Stormur", as the video will generate a brand new set of user-submitted videos if the video is replayed, thus creating a unique music video for each person who views the same video.

Track listing

Personnel
Adapted from Kveikur liner notes.

Sigur Rós
Jón Þór Birgisson – vocals, guitar
Georg Hólm – bass
Orri Páll Dýrason – drums

Additional musicians
Eiríkur Orri Ólafsson - brass arrangement
Daníel Bjarnason - string arrangement
Sigrún Jónsdóttir - brass
Eiríkur Orri Ólafsson - brass
Bergrún Snæbjörnsdóttir - brass
Borgar Magnason - strings
Margrét Árnadóttir - strings
Pálína Árnadóttir - strings
Una Sveinbjarnardóttir - strings
Þórunn Ósk Marinósdóttir - strings

Additional personnel
Ted Jensen - mastering
Rich Costey - mixing
Alex Somers - mixing, recording
Elisabeth Carlsson - assistant mixing
Eric Isip - assistant mixing
Chris Kasych - assistant mixing 
Laura Sisk - assistant mixing
Birgir Jón Birgisson - recording
Valgeir Sigurdsson - recording (strings)

Release history

References

Sigur Rós songs
2013 singles
Songs written by Jónsi
Songs written by Orri Páll Dýrason
Songs written by Georg Hólm
2013 songs
XL Recordings singles